The following outline is provided as an overview of and topical guide to Abraham Lincoln:

Abraham Lincoln16th President of the United States, serving from March 4, 1861, until his assassination in April 1865. Lincoln led the United States through its Civil War—its bloodiest war and its greatest moral, constitutional, and political crisis. In doing so, he preserved the Union, abolished slavery, strengthened the federal government, and modernized the economy.

Political career of Abraham Lincoln

Political philosophy of Abraham Lincoln 

 United States Declaration of Independence – while this document was instrumental in the founding of the United States, it was also a statement of human rights, most notably through the phrase that "all men are created equal". Abraham Lincoln made the document the centerpiece of his rhetoric (as in the Gettysburg Address of 1863), and his policies. He considered it to be the foundation of his political philosophy and argued that the Declaration is a statement of principles through which the United States Constitution should be interpreted.
 Abraham Lincoln and slavery

Electoral history of Abraham Lincoln 

Electoral history of Abraham Lincoln
 Campaigning for Congress (1843)
 Campaigning for Henry Clay (1844)
 Campaigning for Congress (1846)
 Republican National Convention, 1856
 United States Senate election (Illinois), 1858 – Abraham Lincoln was the Republican Party candidate and ran against incumbent Stephen Douglas of the Democratic Party. Stephen Douglas remained Senator, but the debates between the two propelled the popularity of Lincoln and acquired for him a national reputation, which helped him to be chosen as the Republican candidate for president in 1860.
 Lincoln–Douglas debates of 1858 – held publicly in 7 towns, they drew especially large numbers of people from neighboring states, as the issue of slavery was of monumental importance to citizens everywhere in the nation. The debates were covered in complete detail in newspapers across the country.
 Republican National Convention, 1860
 1860 United States presidential election
 1860 campaign song
 Republican National Convention, 1864
 National Union Party
 1864 United States presidential election

Offices held by Abraham Lincoln prior to his presidency 

 Illinois Legislature, 1834–1842
 House of Representatives (1847–1849)

Presidency of Abraham Lincoln 

Presidency of Abraham Lincoln

Events during Abraham Lincoln's presidency 
 First inauguration of Abraham Lincoln
 Perpetual Union
 Lincoln Bible
 Second inauguration of Abraham Lincoln
 Baltimore Plot
 American Civil War
 Origins of the American Civil War
 Alexander Stephens' Cornerstone Speech
 Confiscation Acts
 President Lincoln's 75,000 Volunteers
 Revenue Act of 1861
 Origin of the Anaconda Plan
 RMS Trent Affair
 Habeas Corpus Suspension Act 1863
 Emancipation Proclamation
 Separation of West Virginia from Virginia
 Overland Campaign strategy – Lieutenant General Ulysses S. Grant and President Abraham Lincoln devised a coordinated strategy that would strike at the heart of the Confederacy from multiple directions. This was the first time the Union armies would have a coordinated offensive strategy across a number of theaters.
 Hampton Roads Conference
 Evacuation and Capture of Richmond 
 Lincoln's presidential Reconstruction 
 Thirteenth Amendment to the United States Constitution – the amendment that abolished slavery
 Dakota War of 1862
 Department of the Northwest
 Homestead Act of 1862
 National Bank Act
 Lincoln's Thanksgiving proclamation – in 1863, Lincoln proclaimed Thanksgiving to be a national holiday, and set it as the last Thursday in November. It has remained thus ever since.
 Birchard Letter
 Bixby letter
 Formation of the National Academy of Sciences – the NAS was founded in 1863 by an Act of Congress, and signed into existence by President Lincoln.
 United States Department of Agriculture#Formation and subsequent history
 State of the Union Address, 1863
 1864

Assassination of Abraham Lincoln 

 Assassination of Abraham Lincoln
 Funeral and burial of Abraham Lincoln
 Lincoln catafalque

Abraham Lincoln's notable speeches 

 Lyceum address (1838)
 Peoria speech (1854)
 "Lost Speech" (1856)
 House Divided speech (1858)
 Lincoln-Douglas debates (1858)
 Cooper Union Address (1860)
 Farewell Address (1861)
 First inaugural address (1861)
 Gettysburg Address (1863 event) – this speech was delivered by Lincoln during the American Civil War, four and a half months after the Union victory at the Battle of Gettysburg. In his address, Lincoln reiterated the principles of human equality espoused by the Declaration of Independence and proclaimed the Civil War as a struggle for the preservation of the Union sundered by the secession crisis, with "a new birth of freedom" that would bring true equality to all of its citizens. Lincoln also redefined the Civil War as a struggle not just for the Union, but also for the principle of human equality.
 Second inaugural address (1865)

Personal life of Abraham Lincoln 

 Early life and career of Abraham Lincoln
 Abraham Lincoln in the Black Hawk War
 Matson Trial
 Spot Resolutions
 Abraham Lincoln's patent
 Hurd v. Rock Island Bridge Co.
 Baltimore Plot
 Lincoln's beard
 Medical and mental health of Abraham Lincoln
 Poetry of Abraham Lincoln
 Religious views of Abraham Lincoln
 Sexuality of Abraham Lincoln
 Abraham Lincoln and slavery

Family of Abraham Lincoln 

Lincoln family
 Mary Todd Lincoln (wife)
 Robert Todd Lincoln (son)
 Edward Baker Lincoln (son)
 William Wallace Lincoln (son)
 Thomas "Tad" Lincoln (son)
 Mary Todd "Mamie" Lincoln (granddaughter)
 Abraham Lincoln II (grandson)
 Jessie Lincoln (granddaughter)
 Thomas Lincoln (father)
 Nancy Hanks Lincoln (mother)
 Sarah Bush Lincoln (stepmother)
 Sarah Lincoln Grigsby (sister)
 Abraham Lincoln (paternal grandfather)
 Mordecai Lincoln (paternal uncle)
 Mary Lincoln Crume (paternal aunt)
 John Hanks (maternal cousin)
 Joseph Hanks (great-grandfather)
 Samuel Lincoln (17th-century ancestor)
 Mary Lincoln Beckwith (great-granddaughter)
 Robert Todd Lincoln Beckwith (great-grandson)
 Timothy Lincoln Beckwith (great-great-grandson)

Homes and places 
 Lincoln Trail Homestead State Memorial
 Lincoln's New Salem
 Lincoln Home National Historic Site
 Lincoln Pioneer Village
 Little Pigeon Creek Community
 Cottage at the Soldier's Home
 Lincoln Bedroom
 Lincoln Sitting Room
 Ford's Theatre
 Petersen House
 Lincoln Tomb

Abraham Lincoln's legacy 

 Abraham Lincoln National Heritage Area
 Abraham Lincoln Presidential Library and Museum
 Bibliography of Abraham Lincoln
 Lincoln Highway
 The Papers of Abraham Lincoln
 Lincoln/Net
 List of photographs of Abraham Lincoln
 Lincoln Prize
 Great Moments with Mr. Lincoln

Cultural depictions of Abraham Lincoln 

Cultural depictions of Abraham Lincoln
 Abraham Lincoln on U.S. postage stamps
 Lincoln's image on money
 Lincoln penny
 List of presidents of the United States on currency#Abraham Lincoln
 Films about Lincoln
 Abraham Lincoln (1924)
 The Dramatic Life of Abraham Lincoln (1924)
 Abraham Lincoln (1930)
 Young Mr. Lincoln (1939)
 Abe Lincoln in Illinois (1940)
 The Face of Lincoln (1955)
 Lincoln (2012)
 Killing Lincoln (2013)

Memorials to and monuments of Abraham Lincoln 

Memorials to Abraham Lincoln
 Abraham Lincoln (Healy painting)
 Statue of Abraham Lincoln (District of Columbia City Hall)
 Lincoln's Birthday
 Lincoln Memorial
 Abraham Lincoln (French, 1920) 
 Lincoln Memorial Reflecting Pool
 Abraham Lincoln Birthplace National Historical Park
 Knob Creek Farm
 Lincoln Boyhood National Memorial
 Mount Rushmore
 Lincoln, Nebraska
 Lincoln Park
 Lincoln State Park
 Lincoln Trail State Memorial
 The Peacemakers painting

Statues of Abraham Lincoln 
 Abraham Lincoln: The Man
 Statue of Abraham Lincoln (Lincoln, Nebraska)
 Statue of Abraham Lincoln (District of Columbia City Hall)
 Abraham Lincoln (Lincoln Memorial)
 Lincoln the Lawyer statue
 Abraham Lincoln Statue (Kentucky)
 Young Abe Lincoln (1962)
 Abraham Lincoln: The Head of State
 Abraham Lincoln: The Man statue
 Statue of Abraham Lincoln (Milwaukee)

Curiosities 
 Lincoln's ghost
 Lincoln–Kennedy coincidences urban legend

Publications about Abraham Lincoln 

Bibliography of Abraham Lincoln
 Abraham Lincoln
 Abraham Lincoln's World
 Abraham Lincoln, Friend of the People
 Abraham Lincoln: A History
 Abraham Lincoln: The War Years
 Assassination Vacation
 Forced into Glory
 I Am Abraham Lincoln
 Killing Lincoln
 Lincoln and Darwin
 Lincoln and the Power of the Press: The War for Public Opinion
 Lincoln at Gettysburg
 Lincoln the Unknown
 Lincoln Unmasked
 Team of Rivals: The Political Genius of Abraham Lincoln
 The Fate of Liberty
 The Fiery Trial: Abraham Lincoln and American Slavery
 The Lincoln Conspiracy
 Why Lincoln Matters

Organizations concerning Abraham Lincoln 

 Abraham Lincoln Association
 Abraham Lincoln Institute

See also 

 Outline of the American Civil War

References

External links 

Official
 Abraham Lincoln Presidential Library and Museum
 White House biography

Organizations
 Abraham Lincoln Association
 Abraham Lincoln Bicentennial Foundation

Media coverage
 

Other
 Abraham Lincoln: A Resource Guide from the Library of Congress
"Life Portrait of Abraham Lincoln", from C-SPAN's American Presidents: Life Portraits, June 28, 1999
"Writings of Abraham Lincoln" from C-SPAN's American Writers: A Journey Through History
 Abraham Lincoln: Original Letters and Manuscripts - Shapell Manuscript Foundation
 Lincoln/Net: Abraham Lincoln Historical Digitization Project - Northern Illinois University Libraries
 Teaching Abraham Lincoln - National Endowment for the Humanities
 
 In Popular Song:Our Noble Chief Has Passed Away by Cooper/Thomas

Lincoln, Abraham
Lincoln, Abraham